John Bass may refer to:

John Bass (baseball) (1848–1888), American baseball player
John Bass (cricketer) (1903–1992), English cricketer
John Bass (politician) (1926–2007), American boxer and politician.
John R. Bass (born 1964), U.S. ambassador to Afghanistan
John Meredith Bass (1804–1878), American banker, planter and Whig politician

See also
Jon Bass (born 1976), English footballer
Jon Bass (actor) (born 1989), American actor